Fish curry may refer to:
 Malabar matthi curry, an Indian dish
 Fish head curry, a Singaporean dish where the head of an Ikan Merah (red snapper, literally "Red fish") is used 
 Machher Jhol (also called "Machher Ghonta") a traditional Bengali and Oriya fish curry
 Mas riha, a Maldivian fish curry
 Malu Mirisata, a fish curry from Sri Lanka
 Fish amok, a Khmer fish curry